Chicago '85... The Movie is the second studio album by American contemporary R&B singer Dave Hollister. It was released by DreamWorks Records on November 21, 2000 in the United States. Produced by Hollister himself, it peaked at number 49 on the US Billboard 200 and number 10 on the Top R&B/Hip-Hop Albums chart.

Two singles were released from the album: "One Woman Man" and "Take Care of Home". "One Woman Man" was the most successful single from the album, peaking at number 44 on the Billboard Hot 100. Chicago '85... The Movie was certified gold by the Recording Industry Association of America (RIAA) on February 14, 2001.

Track listing

Samples
"Doin' Wrong" contains a sample of "Cape Wrath" by Morrissey–Mullen.

Charts

Weekly charts

Year-end charts

Certifications

References

External links
 
 

2000 albums
Albums produced by Dave Hollister
Dave Hollister albums
DreamWorks Records albums